"Do-Wah-Doo" is a song by English indie pop singer-songwriter Kate Nash, featured on her 2010 second album My Best Friend Is You (2010). Written by Nash and produced by Bernard Butler, it was released as the lead single from the album on 12 April 2010, one week before the release of the album. "Do-Wah-Doo" was a moderate commercial success, reaching number 15 on the UK Singles Chart – a position exceeded only by her hit song "Foundations" in 2007.

Background
"Do-Wah-Doo" is said to be inspired by 1950s and 1960s girl groups such as The Ronettes and The Supremes, and when asked about it by Spin, Nash said the following:

Critical reception
Nick Levine of Digital Spy gave the song a positive review stating:

Three years later and she hasn't started singing like Kiri Te Kanawa, while her lyrics continue to dance a line between "admirably direct" and "downright bleedin' obvious". Still, there's no denying that 'Do Wah Doo' ushers in a subtle shift in direction for Nash without sacrificing the pop smarts that propped up Bricks. Produced by Bernard Butler, it's a girl-groupy pop nugget featuring lashings of surf guitar, some nice brassy bursts and a brain-invading "bum-bum-de-bum" hook. Will it win her any new fans? To be honest, it'll probably come down to how you feel about a girl-groupy pop nugget that rhymes "lady" and "shady"... wrapped up with the line: "Well, I think she's a bitch..

Music video
The music video for "Do-Wah-Doo", directed by Daniel Brereton, was filmed on 18 February 2010 at Brooklands Museum, Surrey, England. Nash said the following:

In the video, Kate Nash is an airline stewardess, and is a rival to another stewardess (who is shown serving alcoholic drinks to the pilots) for the affections of a handsome male steward.  At the end of the video, whether due to air turbulence, or the drunkenness of the pilots, or the deliberate actions of the pilots, Nash is literally thrown into the arms of the steward by the motions of the plane.

Track listing

Personnel

Musicians
Kate Nash – vocals on all tracks; percussion on "Do-Wah-Doo" and "R n B Side"; piano and keyboards on "Do-Wah-Doo"; synthesizers, recording, production, engineering and mixing on "RnB Side"; art direction
Bernard Butler – bass, production, engineering and mixing on "Do-Wah-Doo" and "Grrrilla Munch"; acoustic guitar, organ and bongos on "Do-Wah-Doo"; synthesizers on "Grrrilla Munch"
Elliott Andrews – drums on "Do-Wah-Doo" and "Grrrilla Munch"
Brett Alaimo – guitars on "Do-Wah-Doo"

Production personnel
Richard Woodcraft – engineering on "Do-Wah-Doo" and "Grrrilla Munch"
Robbie Nelson – engineering on "Do-Wah-Doo" and "Grrrilla Munch"
Adie Kaye – engineering assistance on "Do-Wah-Doo" and "Grrrilla Munch"
Chris Potter – mastering
Additional personnel
Mat Maitland – art direction
Kate Gibb – artwork
Clare Nash – photography

Charts

References

2010 singles
Kate Nash songs
Songs written by Kate Nash
Songs based on actual events
2010 songs
Fiction Records singles